Fadilah Shamika Mohamed Rafi (born 6 April 2005) is a Ugandan badminton player. She started playing badminton when she was 10 year old. She had represented Uganda at the 2022 Commonwealth Games where she played in the women's doubles with Husina Kobugabe. The pair reached the quarter-final where they lost to Chloe Birch and Lauren Smith. In 2023, she won gold at the African Championships for the women's singles.

Achievements

African Championships 
Women's singles

Africa Junior Championships 
Women's singles

Women's doubles

Mixed doubles

BWF International Challenge/Series (1 runner-up) 
Women's doubles

  BWF International Challenge tournament
  BWF International Series tournament

BWF Junior International (2 titles, 1 runner-up) 

Girls' singles

Girls' doubles

Mixed doubles

  BWF Junior International Grand Prix tournament
  BWF Junior International Challenge tournament
  BWF Junior International Series tournament
  BWF Junior Future Series tournament

References

External links 

2005 births
Living people
Sportspeople of Indian descent
Ugandan female badminton players
African Games gold medalists for Uganda
21st-century Ugandan people